is a railway station in Karatsu, Saga Prefecture, Japan. It is operated by JR Kyushu and is on the Chikuhi Line.

Lines
Rapid and local services on the Chikuhi Line stop at this station.

Station layout
The station consists of an island platform serving two elevated tracks. The station building is located under the elevated structure and has both north and south entrances. It houses a waiting area and a staffed ticket window. The island platform is served by elevators. Parking for bicycles is available under the elevated structure.

Management of the station has been outsourced to the JR Kyushu Tetsudou Eigyou Co., a wholly owned subsidiary of JR Kyushu specialising in station services. It staffs the ticket counter which is equipped with a POS machine but does not have a Midori no Madoguchi facility.

Gallery

Adjacent stations

History
The line was extended again with Higashi-Karatsu opening on the east bank of the Matsuura River as the new western terminus on 15 June 1925. On 20 June 1929, the track was extended south down the east bank of the Matsuura River towards . Trains at Higashi-Karatsu executed a switchback before proceeding either south to Yamamoto or east to Nijinomatsubara. When the Kitakyushu Railway was nationalized on 1 October 1937, Japanese Government Railways (JGR) took over control of the station. The line which served the station was designated the Chikuhi Line.

The location of Higashi-Karatsu was inconvenient as the city centre of Karatsu lay on the west bank of the Matsuura River. Passengers wanting to access  station in the city centre had to travel a long dog-leg south via Yamamoto or make a road or foot journey across the river. In 1983, the station was moved, opening at a new location to the southeast on 22 March. The stretch of track down the east bank to Yamamoto with the intermediate stations of Kagami and Kuri was closed. Along with this change of route, the track from  through Higashi-Karatsu to Karatsu was electrified.

With the privatization of Japanese National Railways (JNR), the successor of JGR, on 1 April 1987, control of the station passed to JR Kyushu.

Passenger statistics
In fiscal 2016, the station was used by an average of 823 passengers daily (boarding passengers only), and it ranked 188th  among the busiest stations of JR Kyushu.

Environs
Karatsu Higashi Police Station
Karatsu Business College
Karatsu Royal Hotel
Saga Prefectural Karatsu Higashi Junior High School & High School 
Karatsu Boat Racing

See also
 List of railway stations in Japan

References

External links
Higashi-Karatsu Station (JR Kyushu)

Railway stations in Japan opened in 1925
Chikuhi Line
Railway stations in Saga Prefecture
Stations of Kyushu Railway Company